This is a list of ships that have carried the name Albatros or Albatross, after the seabird.

Merchant ships

 – an American-owned ship that brought news of the outbreak of the War of 1812 to W. P. Hunt.
 – a fisheries research ship in service with the United States Commission of Fish and Fisheries from 1882 to 1898 and from 1898 to 1903 and with the United States Bureau of Fisheries from 1903 to 1917 and from 1919 to 1921 which saw service in the United States Navy as USS Albatross in 1898 and from 1917 to 1919.
 – a ketch which was the last sailing vessel trading commercially in Europe. Now a sail training vessel.
 – a Dutch/German sailing ship that was later used as a training ship, inspiring the film White Squall.
 – a fisheries research ship in service with the United States Bureau of Fisheries from 1926 to 1932 which saw service in the United States Navy as the tug USS Patuxent (AT-11) from 1909 to 1924.
 – a fisheries research ship built in 1926 as the trawler Harvard. In service with the United States National Fish and Wildlife Service from 1948 to 1959 and briefly saw service with the United States Coast Guard in 1944 as USCGC Bellefonte.
Albatros, a hydrofoil in service on Lake Geneva between 1964 and 1972
Albatross – a sailing ship used in Sweden's Albatross expedition of 1947–48.
 – a cruise liner built in 1952, in service as Albatros 1981–84. Also in service as  1985–88.
 – an ocean liner, in service as Albatros 1993–2003.
 – a fisheries research ship in commission with the United States Fish and Wildlife Service from 1963 to 1970 and with the National Oceanic and Atmospheric Administration from 1970 to 2008.
 – a cruise liner built in 1973, in service as Albatros since 2004
 a Dutch fishing trawler in service 1971-74

Naval ships

Australia
 – a seaplane carrier launched in 1928 that left service in 1933 and was transferred to the Royal Navy in 1938.

Austria-Hungary
, an Austro-Hungarian gunboat involved in Pacific exploration.

France
, an  launched in 1930 and scrapped in 1959.

Germany
, a German gunboat commissioned in 1871, stricken in 1899, and lost in 1906 while in use as a collier.
, a German minelaying cruiser commissioned in 1908 and stricken in 1921.
German torpedo boat Albatros (1926) – a Type 23 torpedo boat in service until wrecked on 10 April 1940.
, an

Italy
 -  a torpedo boat in service 1907-23
 – a submarine chaser and torpedo boat in service 1934–41.

United Kingdom
   – a 16-gun  launched in 1795 and sold in 1807.
   – a survey schooner purchased in 1826 and sold in 1833.
   – a 16-gun brig-sloop launched in 1842 and broken up in 1860.
 HMS Albatross  – to have been a wood screw sloop. She was ordered in 1862 but was cancelled in 1863.
   – a  composite screw sloop launched in 1873 and broken up in 1889.
   – a torpedo boat destroyer launched in 1898, reclassified as a  destroyer in 1913 and sold in 1920.
   – a seaplane tender launched in 1928 for the Royal Australian Navy. She was transferred to the Royal Navy in 1938, and converted to a repair ship in 1942.  She was sold into mercantile service in 1946 and was sold for scrapping in 1954.

United States
 – a steam gunboat in service 1861–65.
 – formerly USFC Albatross, in service 1898 and 1917–19.
 – a motor launch in service 1917–19.
USS Albatross (AM-391) – a proposed minesweeper, contract cancelled in 1945.
Carried the name Albatross from 1947.

See also
 – a naval aviation base at Nowra, New South Wales, which was opened in 1948 and is currently active.
Albatross (disambiguation)  – for other uses of Albatross.

References

Albatross